The Harbin–Dalian high-speed railway or Hada High-Speed Railway is a high-speed rail line connecting Harbin, Heilongjiang and Dalian, Liaoning. Construction work began on August 23, 2007 and the first commercial services began operating in December 1, 2012, nearly one year behind schedule. The line is the world's first alpine high-speed railway operating at high latitudes and low temperatures in winter. The trains can continue operating even with snow on the line and the tracks are fitted with de-icing technology. The project cost CN¥95 billion, which was 25% more than the original budget.

At the time of completion, the railway was the northernmost high-speed line in China. The climate of northeast China poses a challenge to the design; parts of the line had to be rebuilt before the opening due to deformation caused by frost heaving. The summer high-speed services also have higher ticket prices than the slower winter service; however, some trains continue to run all year at the  speed and lower price, giving travellers a choice of speed versus ticket price.

Under the winter timetable, the  journey from Dalian to Harbin takes five hours eighteen minutes. In summer, the higher speeds reduce the journey time to just three and a half hours.

Test runs along the entire railway started on October 8, 2012. The first commercial passenger services started on December 1, 2012 with two trains leaving simultaneously, one from Dalian and the other from the new Harbin West station. During the first 52 days of operation, the line transported 2.856 million passengers. By the end of March, there had been 9.4 million passenger trips on the line, an average of 78,000 per day. During the four weeks of the Chinese spring festival, passengers reached peaks of 164,000 per day.

Testing of services at the increased summer speed of  began in April 2013 after a delay of one month. Commercial services on the summer schedule began on the April 21st, 2013.
The line operates 67 pairs of CRH380BG type alpine EMU trains. Extra insulation has been added within the skin of the carriages and even the vacuum toilets have been modified to operate in this extreme cold.

The track has been specially designed to cope with extremes in temperature. In winter, the temperatures on the route can fall to  while in summer they can reach . Heavy snowfall in the area is also common during winter. This large change in temperature can cause frost heave. As the water in the ground freezes in winter, it expands. In summer the ice melts and water drains causing shrinkage. This creates distortion on the ground surface that ordinary high speed railway lines could not cope with. To combat frost heave, 70% of the line is constructed above the ground surface on viaducts. During construction, about 20 percent of the track that had been built directly on the ground had to be redesigned and rebuilt due to frost damage. This delayed the opening of the line by about a year.

Stations

See also
 Asia Express
 South Manchuria Railway, about the early history of the railways in the same corridor
 Beijing–Harbin high-speed railway
 Beijing–Shenyang high-speed railway
 Panjin–Yingkou high-speed railway

References 

High-speed railway lines in China
Standard gauge railways in China
Rail transport in Heilongjiang
Rail transport in Jilin
Rail transport in Liaoning
2
Railway lines opened in 2012